Plaza de Toros de Illumbe, also known as Donostia Arena, is an arena in San Sebastián, Spain. It is primarily used for basketball and the home arena of San Sebastián Gipuzkoa BC. The arena holds 11,000 people and opened in 1998. In accord with its name, it is also used for bullfighting.

See also
 List of indoor arenas in Spain

References

External links
Official site

Indoor arenas in Spain
Basketball venues in Spain
Bullrings in Spain
Gipuzkoa Basket
Sports venues in the Basque Country (autonomous community)